Mary Clouston Dive (born 26 June 1913 in Five Dock and died 10 September 1997 in Roseville) was a scientist and an Australian cricketer who played seven women's test matches from 1948 to 1951. Mollie graduated from Sydney University with a science degree and was employed by the CSIRO for most of her life. She was usually known as "Mollie" or, less often, "Molly".

References

Further reading

 

1913 births
1997 deaths
Australia women Test cricketers
New South Wales cricketers
Cricketers from Sydney